Three Rivers is an American medical drama television series that aired on CBS from October 4, 2009, to July 3, 2010, and starred Alex O'Loughlin in the role of a famous transplant surgeon in Pittsburgh, Pennsylvania. On November 30, 2009, after just eight episodes of the season had aired Sunday at 9:00 pm (EST), CBS announced that Three Rivers had been pulled from its schedule with no plans to have it returned, and the series was later officially cancelled. However, the remaining unaired episodes were burned off Saturdays at 8:00 pm (EST).

Development
With the long-running NBC drama ER coming to an end, CBS executives put out a call for a new medical show to fill the void. Carol Barbee was introduced via Curtis Hanson to a pitch by Steve Boman, a former transplant coordinator and Chicago newspaper reporter, for a drama about a transplant hospital. Barbee decided to undertake the project, telling it from three points of view: the donor's, the recipient's, and the doctor's. The location for the show's setting in Pittsburgh was decided based on a determination that the  University of Pittsburgh Medical Center (UPMC) was the world's leading transplant center with the coincidence that the dominant topographical feature of the city, the confluence of the Allegheny, Monongahela, and Ohio rivers, would provide an allegory for the show's three points of view. Barbee did her research for the show at The Cleveland Clinic with Dr. Gonzalo Gonzalez-Stawinski, who also tutored the show's lead star Alex O'Loughlin. Dr. Robert Kormos, co-director of heart transplantation at UPMC, also provided input. Transplant pioneer Thomas Starzl, who visited the set, is the inspiration for the fictional transplant pioneer who is revealed to be the father of character Dr. Miranda Foster.

The pilot for the Pittsburgh-set medical drama was filmed in western Pennsylvania in March and April 2009 using the closed Brownsville Tri-County Hospital and the David L. Lawrence Convention Center for hospital interior scenes. Post-pilot recasting resulted in actors Julia Ormond and Joaquim de Almeida departing and Alfre Woodard and Amber Clayton joining the series. Ultimately, the pilot was dropped and a new episode was shot for the television premiere. A high-tech, more visually appealing hospital set for the ER and ICU was built on sound stages 19 and 20 at Paramount Pictures, where interior scenes were thereafter produced, although location shooting still occurred in Pittsburgh for exterior shots.

Cast and characters

Main
Alex O'Loughlin as Dr. Andrew "Andy" Yablonski, a cardiothoracic surgeon being groomed by Dr. Jordan to take over the transplant department
Katherine Moennig as Dr. Miranda Foster, a surgical fellow from Philadelphia and daughter of Andy's former mentor Dr. William Foster
Daniel Henney as Dr. David Lee, an ophthalmology resident and ladies' man
Christopher Hanke as Ryan Abbott
Justina Machado as Pam Acosta
Amber Clayton as Dr. Lisa Reed

Alfre Woodard as Dr. Sophia Jordan, the no-nonsense head of transplant

Supporting

Julia Ormond as Dr. Sophia Jordan, unaired pilot
Britt Robertson as Brenda Stark
Nicholas Braun as Michael
Devika Parikh as Nurse Rekha/Nurse/ER Nurse/ER Nurse #2
Owiso Odera as Kuol/Kuol Adebe Ketebo
Joe Holt as Bret/EMT/EMT Bret 
Puja Mohindra as EMT/EMT Lori Goel/Goel/Lori Goel/Marilyn/Medic #3
Claudia Choi as ICU Nurse/Nurse Chen
Sabra Williams as Nurse Williams/ER Nurse #1/ER Nurse #2
Teri Reeves as Nurse Alicia/Alicia/Alicia Wilson/Nurse
Bruce Katzman as Dr. Richard Strauss
Mercedes Masöhn as Vanessa
Shiloh Fernandez as Scott Barker/Scott
Rizwan Manji as Dr. Dev/Dr. Drev/Male Doctor
Louie Alegria as EMT/EMT #1/Medic #1
Paull Walia as Dr. Inder Patel
Caryn West as Dr. Susan Heyworth
William Sadler as Michael Zelasko
Oded Fehr as Dr. Luc Bovell
Kelly Overton as Det. Rena Yablonski
John Bedford Lloyd as Dr. Yorn
Omid Abtahi as Dr. Yousef Khouri
B. J. Britt as Antoine/Anton Weathers
Stacey Scowley as Bullpen Nurse/Bullpen nurse
Brooklyn McLinn as ER Nurse/ER Nurse #1
Page Leong as Dr. Margolis/Female Doctor
Kenny Champion as Eddie Baines/Pat
Kathleen M. Darcy as Hepatologist
Lynn Adrianna Freedman as ER Nurse #1/Nurse #1
Mustafa Haidari as Doctor
Michelle Diaz as Nurse Liza Salazar/O.R. Nurse
Aisha Kabia as Melissa
Noah Fleiss as Sam Heaton

Episodes

References

External links

CBS original programming
2009 American television series debuts
2010 American television series endings
Television shows set in Pittsburgh
English-language television shows
2000s American medical television series
2010s American medical television series
Television series by CBS Studios
2000s American drama television series
2010s American drama television series